Vasilyovo is a rural locality (a village) in Rozhdestvenskoye Rural Settlement, Sobinsky District, Vladimir Oblast, Russia. The population was 8 as of 2010.

Geography 
Vasilyovo is located 39 km north of Sobinka (the district's administrative centre) by road. Kornevo is the nearest rural locality.

References 

Rural localities in Sobinsky District